The Commonwealth Bank Tennis Classic was a tennis tournament on the WTA Tour held in Bali, Indonesia in 2007 and 2008. During the period 1994–2006 it was known as Wismilak International, organized successively in Surabaya (1994–1997), Kuala Lumpur (1999–2000) and Bali (2001–2006). The tournament was played on outdoor hardcourts. In 2009 the tournament was replaced with the Commonwealth Bank Tournament of Champions.

Finals

Singles

Doubles

External links
Official website 

 
Tennis tournaments in Indonesia
Hard court tennis tournaments
WTA Tour
Recurring sporting events established in 2001
Recurring sporting events disestablished in 2008
Defunct tennis tournaments in Indonesia
Defunct sports competitions in Indonesia